Strepsa was an ancient city of Mygdonia, Macedon, near Therma, toward Chalcidice.  The editors of the Barrington Atlas of the Greek and Roman World, tentatively identify Strepsa with the modern village of Basilika, in the municipality of Pylaia.  Strepsa is mentioned by Thucydides (I.61.4). It was a member of the Delian League.

References

W. Hazlitt, The Classical Gazetteer.

Geography of ancient Mygdonia
Cities in ancient Macedonia
Populated places in ancient Macedonia
Former populated places in Greece
Members of the Delian League